Maidan is a station of the Kolkata Metro. The station is located on Jawaharlal Nehru Road at Middleton Street. It is named after the Maidan, the largest urban park in Kolkata, which lies on the west side of Jawaharlal Nehru Road.

History

Construction

The station

Structure
Maidan is an underground metro station, situated on the Kolkata Metro Line 1 of Kolkata Metro.

Station layout

See also

Kolkata
List of Kolkata Metro stations
Transport in Kolkata
Kolkata Metro Rail Corporation
Kolkata Suburban Railway
Kolkata Monorail
Trams in Kolkata
Bhowanipore
Chowringhee Road
List of rapid transit systems
List of metro systems

References

External links
 
 
 Official Website for line 1
 UrbanRail.Net – descriptions of all metro systems in the world, each with a schematic map showing all stations.

Kolkata Metro stations
Railway stations in Kolkata
Railway stations opened in 1984
1984 establishments in West Bengal